The following outline is provided as an overview of and topical guide to physics:

Physics – natural science that involves the study of matter and its motion through spacetime, along with related concepts such as energy and force. More broadly, it is the general analysis of nature, conducted in order to understand how the universe behaves.

What type of subject is physics? 
Physics can be described as all of the following:
An academic discipline – one with academic departments, curricula and degrees; national and international societies; and specialized journals.
A scientific field (a branch of science) – widely recognized category of specialized expertise within science, and typically embodies its own terminology and nomenclature. Such a field will usually be represented by one or more scientific journals, where peer-reviewed research is published.
A natural science – one that seeks to elucidate the rules that govern the natural world using empirical and scientific methods.
A physical science – one that studies non-living systems.
A biological science – one that studies the role of physical processes in living organisms. 'See Outline of biophysics.'

Branches of physics
Astronomy – studies the universe beyond Earth, including its formation and development, and the evolution, physics, chemistry, meteorology, and motion of celestial objects (such as galaxies, planets, etc.) and phenomena that originate outside the atmosphere of Earth (such as the cosmic background radiation).
Astrodynamics – application of ballistics and celestial mechanics to the practical problems concerning the motion of rockets and other spacecraft.
 Astrometry – the branch of astronomy that involves precise measurements of the positions and movements of stars and other celestial bodies.
 Astrophysics – the study of the physical aspects of celestial objects
 Celestial mechanics - the branch of theoretical astronomy that deals with the calculation of the motions of celestial objects such as planets.
 Extragalactic astronomy – the branch of astronomy concerned with objects outside our own Milky Way Galaxy
 Galactic astronomy – the study of our own Milky Way galaxy and all its contents.
 Physical cosmology – the study of the largest-scale structures and dynamics of the universe and is concerned with fundamental questions about its formation and evolution.
 Planetary science – the scientific study of planets (including Earth), moons, and planetary systems, in particular those of the Solar System and the processes that form them.
 Stellar astronomy – natural science that deals with the study of celestial objects (such as stars, planets, comets, nebulae, star clusters, and galaxies) and phenomena that originate outside the atmosphere of Earth (such as cosmic background radiation)
 Atmospheric physics – the study of the application of physics to the atmosphere
 Atomic, molecular, and optical physics – the study of how matter and light interact
 Optics – the branch of physics which involves the behavior and properties of light, including its interactions with matter and the construction of instruments that use or detect it.
 Biophysics – interdisciplinary science that uses the methods of physics to study biological systems
 Neurophysics – branch of biophysics dealing with the nervous system.
 Polymer physics – field of physics that studies polymers, their fluctuations, mechanical properties, as well as the kinetics of reactions involving degradation and polymerization of polymers and monomers respectively.
 Quantum biology - application of quantum mechanics to biological phenomenon.
 Chemical physics – the branch of physics that studies chemical processes from physics.
 Computational physics – study and implementation of numerical algorithms to solve problems in physics for which a quantitative theory already exists.
 Condensed matter physics – the study of the physical properties of condensed phases of matter.
 Electricity – the study of electrical phenomena.
 Electromagnetism – branch of science concerned with the forces that occur between electrically charged particles.
 Geophysics – the physics of the Earth and its environment in space; also the study of the Earth using quantitative physical methods
 Magnetism – the study of physical phenomena that are mediated by magnetic field.
 Mathematical physics – application of mathematics to problems in physics and the development of mathematical methods for such applications and the formulation of physical theories.
 Mechanics – the branch of physics concerned with the behavior of physical bodies when subjected to forces or displacements, and the subsequent effects of the bodies on their environment.
 Aerodynamics – study of the motion of air.  
 Biomechanics – the study of the structure and function of biological systems such as humans, animals, plants, organs, and cells using the methods of mechanics.
 Classical mechanics – one of the two major sub-fields of mechanics, which is concerned with the set of physical laws describing the motion of bodies under the action of a system of forces.
 Kinematics – branch of classical mechanics that describes the motion of points, bodies (objects) and systems of bodies (groups of objects) without consideration of the causes of motion.
 Homeokinetics - the physics of complex, self-organizing systems
 Continuum mechanics – the branch of mechanics that deals with the analysis of the kinematics and the mechanical behavior of materials modeled as a continuous mass rather than as discrete particles.
 Dynamics – the study of the causes of motion and changes in motion
 Fluid mechanics – the study of fluids and the forces on them.
 Fluid statics – study of fluids at rest
 Fluid kinematics – study of fluids in motion
 Fluid dynamics – study of the effect of forces on fluid motion
 Statics – the branch of mechanics concerned with the analysis of loads (force, torque/moment) on physical systems in static equilibrium, that is, in a state where the relative positions of subsystems do not vary over time, or where components and structures are at a constant velocity.
 Statistical mechanics – the branch of physics which studies any physical system that has a large number of degrees of freedom.
 Thermodynamics – the branch of physical science concerned with heat and its relation to other forms of energy and work.
 Nuclear physics – field of physics that studies the building blocks and interactions of atomic nuclei.
 Particle physics – the branch of physics that studies the properties and interactions of the fundamental constituents of matter and energy.
 Psychophysics – quantitatively investigates the relationship between physical stimuli and the sensations and perceptions they affect.
 Plasma physics – the study of plasma, a state of matter similar to gas in which a certain portion of the particles are ionized.
 Quantum physics – branch of physics dealing with physical phenomena where the action is on the order of the Planck constant.
 Quantum field theory - the application of quantum theory to the study of fields (systems with infinite degrees of freedom).
 Quantum information theory - the study of the information-processing capabilities afforded by quantum mechanics.
 Quantum foundations - the discipline focussing in understanding the counterintuitive aspects of the theory, including trying to find physical principles underlying them, and proposing generalisations of quantum theory.
 Quantum gravity - the search for an account of gravitation fully compatible with quantum theory.
 Relativity – theory of physics which describes the relationship between space and time.
 General Relativity - a geometric, non-quantum theory of gravitation.
 Special Relativity - a theory that describes the propagation of matter and light at high speeds.
Other
 Agrophysics – the study of physics applied to agroecosystems
 Soil physics – the study of soil physical properties and processes.
 Cryogenics – cryogenics is the study of the production of very low temperature (below −150 °C, −238 °F or 123K) and the behavior of materials at those temperatures.
 Econophysics – interdisciplinary research field, applying theories and methods originally developed by physicists to solve problems in economics
 Materials physics – use of physics to describe materials in many different ways such as force, heat, light, and mechanics.
 Vehicle dynamics – dynamics of vehicles, here assumed to be ground vehicles.
 Philosophy of physics - deals with conceptual and interpretational issues in modern physics, many of which overlap with research done by certain kinds of theoretical physicists.

History of physics 
History of physics – history of the physical science that studies matter and its motion through space-time, and related concepts such as energy and force
 History of acoustics – history of the study of mechanical waves in solids, liquids, and gases (such as vibration and sound)
 History of agrophysics – history of the study of physics applied to agroecosystems
 History of soil physics – history of the study of soil physical properties and processes.
 History of astrophysics – history of the study of the physical aspects of celestial objects
History of astronomy – history of the studies the universe beyond Earth, including its formation and development, and the evolution, physics, chemistry, meteorology, and motion of celestial objects (such as galaxies, planets, etc.) and phenomena that originate outside the atmosphere of Earth (such as the cosmic background radiation).
 History of astrodynamics – history of the application of ballistics and celestial mechanics to the practical problems concerning the motion of rockets and other spacecraft.
 History of astrometry – history of the branch of astronomy that involves precise measurements of the positions and movements of stars and other celestial bodies.
 History of cosmology – history of the discipline that deals with the nature of the Universe as a whole.
 History of extragalactic astronomy – history of the branch of astronomy concerned with objects outside our own Milky Way Galaxy
 History of galactic astronomy – history of the study of our own Milky Way galaxy and all its contents.
 History of physical cosmology – history of the study of the largest-scale structures and dynamics of the universe and is concerned with fundamental questions about its formation and evolution.
 History of planetary science – history of the scientific study of planets (including Earth), moons, and planetary systems, in particular those of the Solar System and the processes that form them.
 History of stellar astronomy – history of the natural science that deals with the study of celestial objects (such as stars, planets, comets, nebulae, star clusters and galaxies) and phenomena that originate outside the atmosphere of Earth (such as cosmic background radiation)
 History of atmospheric physics – history of the study of the application of physics to the atmosphere
 History of atomic, molecular, and optical physics – history of the study of how matter and light interact
 History of biophysics – history of the study of physical processes relating to biology
 History of medical physics – history of the application of physics concepts, theories and methods to medicine.
 History of neurophysics – history of the branch of biophysics dealing with the nervous system.
 History of chemical physics – history of the branch of physics that studies chemical processes from the point of view of physics.
 History of computational physics – history of the study and implementation of numerical algorithms to solve problems in physics for which a quantitative theory already exists.
 History of condensed matter physics – history of the study of the physical properties of condensed phases of matter.
 History of cryogenics – history of the cryogenics is the study of the production of very low temperature (below −150 °C, −238 °F or 123K) and the behavior of materials at those temperatures.
 Dynamics – history of the study of the causes of motion and changes in motion
 History of econophysics – history of the interdisciplinary research field, applying theories and methods originally developed by physicists in order to solve problems in economics
 History of electromagnetism – history of the branch of science concerned with the forces that occur between electrically charged particles.
 History of geophysics – history of the physics of the Earth and its environment in space; also the study of the Earth using quantitative physical methods
 History of materials physics – history of the use of physics to describe materials in many different ways such as force, heat, light and mechanics.
 History of mathematical physics – history of the application of mathematics to problems in physics and the development of mathematical methods for such applications and for the formulation of physical theories.
 History of mechanics – history of the branch of physics concerned with the behavior of physical bodies when subjected to forces or displacements, and the subsequent effects of the bodies on their environment.
 History of biomechanics – history of the study of the structure and function of biological systems such as humans, animals, plants, organs, and cells by means of the methods of mechanics.
 History of classical mechanics – history of the one of the two major sub-fields of mechanics, which is concerned with the set of physical laws describing the motion of bodies under the action of a system of forces.
 History of continuum mechanics – history of the branch of mechanics that deals with the analysis of the kinematics and the mechanical behavior of materials modeled as a continuous mass rather than as discrete particles.
 History of fluid mechanics – history of the study of fluids and the forces on them.
 History of quantum mechanics – history of the branch of physics dealing with physical phenomena where the action is on the order of the Planck constant.
 History of thermodynamics – history of the branch of physical science concerned with heat and its relation to other forms of energy and work.
 History of nuclear physics – history of the field of physics that studies the building blocks and interactions of atomic nuclei.
 History of optics – history of the branch of physics which involves the behavior and properties of light, including its interactions with matter and the construction of instruments that use or detect it.
 History of particle physics – history of the branch of physics that studies the existence and interactions of particles that are the constituents of what is usually referred to as matter or radiation.
 History of psychophysics – history of the quantitative investigations of the relationship between physical stimuli and the sensations and perceptions they affect.
 History of plasma physics – history of the state of matter similar to gas in which a certain portion of the particles are ionized.
 History of polymer physics – history of the field of physics that studies polymers, their fluctuations, mechanical properties, as well as the kinetics of reactions involving degradation and polymerization of polymers and monomers respectively.
 History of quantum physics – history of the branch of physics dealing with physical phenomena where the action is on the order of the Planck constant.
 History of the theory of relativity - history of the special and the general theory of relativity
 History of special relativity - history of the study of the relationship between space and time in the absence of gravity
 History of general relativity - history of the non-quantum theory of gravity
 History of statics – history of the branch of mechanics concerned with the analysis of loads (force, torque/moment) on physical systems in static equilibrium, that is, in a state where the relative positions of subsystems do not vary over time, or where components and structures are at a constant velocity.
 History of solid-state physics – history of the study of rigid matter, or solids, through methods such as quantum mechanics, crystallography, electromagnetism, and metallurgy.
 History of vehicle dynamics – history of the dynamics of vehicles, here assumed to be ground vehicles.

General concepts of physics

Basic principles of physics
Physics – branch of science that studies matter and its motion through space and time, along with related concepts such as energy and force.   Physics is one of the "fundamental sciences" because the other natural sciences (like biology, geology  etc.) deal with systems that seem to obey the laws of physics. According to physics, the physical laws of matter, energy and the fundamental forces of nature govern the interactions between particles and physical entities (such as planets, molecules, atoms or the subatomic particles). Some of the basic pursuits of physics, which include some of the most prominent developments in modern science in the last millennium, include:

Describing the nature, measuring and quantifying of bodies and their motion, dynamics etc.
Newton's laws of motion
Mass, force and weight (Mass versus weight)
Momentum and conservation of energy
Gravity, theories of gravity
Energy, work, and their relationship
Motion, position, and energy
 Different forms of Energy, their inter-conversion and the inevitable loss of energy in the form of heat (Thermodynamics)
Energy conservation, conversion, and transfer.
Energy source the transfer of energy from one source to work in another.
Kinetic molecular theory
Phases of matter and phase transitions
Temperature and thermometers
Energy and heat
Heat flow: conduction, convection, and radiation
The four laws of thermodynamics
The principles of waves and sound
The principles of electricity, magnetism, and electromagnetism
The principles, sources, and properties of light
 Basic quantities
 Acceleration
 Electric charge
 Energy
 Entropy
 Force
 Length
 Mass
 Matter
 Momentum
 Potential energy
 Space
 Temperature
 Time
 Velocity
Gravity, light, physical system, physical observation, physical quantity, physical state, physical unit, physical theory, physical experiment

Theoretical concepts:
Mass–energy equivalence, elementary particle, physical law, fundamental force, physical constant

Fundamental concepts 
 Causality
 Symmetry
  Action
 Covariance
 Space
 Time
 Oscillations and Waves
 Physical field
 Physical interaction
 Statistical ensemble
 Quantum
 Particle

Measurement 
 Measurement
 SI units
 Conversion of units
 Length
 Time
 Mass
 Density

Motion 
 Motion
 Velocity
 Speed
 Acceleration
 Constant acceleration
 Newton's laws of motion

Overview of physics

This is a list of the primary theories in physics, major subtopics, and concepts.
Note: the Theory column below contains links to articles with infoboxes at the top of their respective pages which list the major concepts.

Concepts by field

Lists

Index of physics articles
List of common physics notations
Lists of physics equations
List of important publications in physics
List of laws in science
List of letters used in mathematics and science
List of physicists
List of physics journals
List of scientific units named after people
Variables commonly used in physics
List of physics awards

See also

:Category:Concepts in physics
:Category:Physics-related lists
Elementary physics formulae
Glossary of classical physics
List of physics concepts in primary and secondary education curricula

Notes

Works cited

External links

AIP.org is the website of the American Institute of Physics
IOP.org is the website of the Institute of Physics
APS.org is the website of the American Physical Society
SPS National is the website of the American Society of Physics Students
CAP.ca is the website of the Canadian Association of Physicists
EPS.org is the website of the European Physical Society
Meta Institute for Computational Physics - Popular Talks
ScienceMathMastery - Compilation of YouTube Physics Courses
Physics | Channel | MIT Video
How to become a GOOD Theoretical Physicist, a website with outline of theoretical physics by Gerard 't Hooft
The Feynman Lectures on Physics, 3 vols., free online, Caltech & The Feynman Lectures Website
Resource recommendations - List of freely available physics books - Physics Stack Exchange

Physics
Physics